Peter Altenberg (9 March 1859 – 8 January 1919) was a writer and poet from Vienna, Austria.  He played a key role in the genesis of early modernism in the city.

Biography
He was born Richard Engländer on 9 March 1859 in Vienna.  The nom de plume, "Altenberg", came from a small town on the Danube river.  Allegedly, he chose the "Peter" to honor a young girl whom he remembered as an unrequited love (it had been her nickname).  Although he grew up in a middle class Jewish family, Altenberg eventually separated himself from his family of origin by dropping out of both law and medical school, and embracing Bohemianism as a permanent lifestyle choice.  He cultivated a feminine appearance and feminine handwriting, wore a cape, sandals and a broad-brimmed hat, and despised 'macho' masculinity.

Discovered by Arthur Schnitzler in 1894 and appreciated by Hugo von Hofmannsthal and Karl Kraus, Altenberg was one of the main proponents of Viennese Impressionism. He was a master of short, aphoristic stories based on close observation of everyday life events. After reading Altenberg's first published collection Wie ich es sehe (1896) Hofmannsthal wrote: "Even though entirely unconcerned with things important, the book has such a good conscience that one can immediately see that it cannot possibly be a German book. It is truly Viennese. It flaunts it – its origin – as it flaunts its attitude."

At the fin de siècle, when Vienna was a major crucible and center for modern arts and culture, Altenberg was a very influential part of a literary and artistic movement known as Jung-Wien (Young Vienna). Altenberg was a contemporary of Karl Kraus, Gustav Mahler, Arthur Schnitzler, Gustav Klimt, and Adolf Loos, with whom he had a very close relationship. He was somewhat older, in his early 30s, than the others. His oeuvre consists of short, poetic prose pieces that do not easily fit into usual formal categories. The inspiration for his trademark short prose he drew from the concise aesthetic of Charles Baudelaire's prose poems and the spatial limitations of the 'Correspondenzkarte,' the postcard, first launched and disseminated in his native Austria in 1869.

He became well known throughout Vienna after the publication of a book of his fragmentary observations of women and children in everyday street activities. Because most of his literary work was written while he frequented various Viennese bars and coffeehouses, Altenberg is sometimes referred to as a cabaret or coffee house poet. His favorite coffeehouse was the Café Central, to which he even had his mail delivered.

Altenberg's detractors said he was a drug addict and a womanizer. Altenberg was also rumored to have problems with alcoholism and mental illness. Yet his admirers considered him to be a highly creative individual with a great love for the aesthetic, for nature, and for young girls. He is certainly known to have had a large collection of photographs and drawings of young girls, and those who knew him well (such as the daughter of his publisher) wrote of his adoration of young girls.

Altenberg was never a commercially successful writer, but he did enjoy most if not all of the benefits of fame in his lifetime. Altenberg was at one point nominated for the Nobel Prize. Some of the aphoristic poetry he wrote on the backs of postcards and scraps of paper were set to music by composer Alban Berg. In 1913, Berg's Five songs on picture postcard texts by Peter Altenberg were premiered in Vienna. The piece caused an uproar, and the performance had to be halted: a complete performance of the work was not given until 1952.

Altenberg, like many writers and artists, was constantly short of money, but he was adept at making friends, cultivating patrons, and convincing others to pay for his meals, his champagne, even his rent, with which he was frequently late. He repaid his debts with his talent, his wit, and his charm. Many academics consider him to have been a "bohemian's bohemian."

Most of Altenberg's work is published in the German language and, outside of anthology pieces, is difficult to find. Much of it remains in university libraries or private collections. Two selections have been translated, Evocations of Love (1960) and Telegrams of the Soul: Selected Prose of Peter Altenberg (2005).

Altenberg, who never married, died on 8 January 1919, aged 59. He is buried at Central Cemetery in Vienna, Austria.

In popular culture 
The Altenberg Trio is named after Peter Altenberg.

Works

German 
 Wie ich es sehe. S. Fischer, Berlin 1896; Manesse, Zürich 2007, 
 Ashantee. Fischer, Berlin 1897; Loecker, Wien 2008, 
 Was der Tag mir zuträgt. Fünfundfünfzig neue Studien. Fischer, Berlin 1901
 Prodromos. Fischer, Berlin 1906
 Märchen des Lebens. Fischer, Berlin 1908; veränd. A. ebd. 1919
 Die Auswahl aus meinen Büchern. Fischer, Berlin 1908
 Bilderbögen des kleinen Lebens. Reiss, Berlin 1909
 Neues Altes. Fischer, Berlin 1911 (Digitalised at Bielefeld University)
 Semmering 1912. Fischer, Berlin 1913; verm. A. ebd. 1919
 Fechsung. Fischer, Berlin 1915
 Nachfechsung. Fischer, Berlin 1916
 Vita ipsa. Fischer, Berlin 1918
 Mein Lebensabend. Fischer, Berlin 1919 (Digitalised at Bielefeld University
 Der Nachlass von Peter Altenberg, zusammensgestellt von Alfred Polgar. Fischer, Berlin 1925.
 Peter Altenberg. Auswahl von Karl Kraus, herausgegeben von . Atlantis, Zürich 1963
 Das Buch der Bücher von Peter Altenberg, zusammengestellt von Karl Kraus. 3 Bände. Wallstein, Göttingen 2009, 
 Die Selbsterfindung eines Dichters. Briefe und Dokumente 1892–1896. Hrsg. und mit einem Nachwort von Leo A. Lensing. Wallstein, Göttingen 2009,

English translated 
 Telegrams of the Soul: Selected Prose of Peter Altenberg (2005). Trans. Peter Wortsman
 Ashantee. (Studies in Austrian Literature, Culture, and Thought) (2007). Trans. Katharina von Hammerstein
 Alexander King Presents Peter Altenberg's Evocations of Love (1960). Trans. Alexander King

References

Further reading
 Simpson, Josephine Mary Nelmes (1987). Peter Altenberg: A Neglected Writer of the Viennese Jahrhundertwende. Peter Lang GmbH.
 Wittels, Fritz (1995). Freud and the Child Woman: The Memoirs of Fritz Wittels. Yale University Press. (Has the best account of the erotic subculture of Vienna at the time).

External links

 
 
 
Works of Peter Altenberg at Zeno.org (German)
Some works of Peter Altenberg, Austrian Literature Online
Selected works (English)
Two short stories

1859 births
1919 deaths
Writers from Vienna
19th-century Austrian Jews
Aphorists
Young Vienna
19th-century Austrian male writers
20th-century Austrian male writers
Burials at the Vienna Central Cemetery